The volleyball tournaments at the 2012 Olympic Games in London were played between 28 July and 12 August.

The indoor volleyball competition took place at Earls Court Exhibition Centre, in west London, and the beach volleyball tournament was held at Horse Guards Parade in central London.

Events
Four sets of medals were awarded in the following events:

 Indoor volleyball – men (12 teams)
 Indoor volleyball – women (12 teams)
 Beach volleyball – men (24 teams)
 Beach volleyball – women (24 teams)

Qualifying criteria
Each National Olympic Committee was allowed to enter one men's and one women's qualified team in the volleyball tournaments and two men's and two women's qualified teams in the beach volleyball.

Men's indoor volleyball qualification

Details of the men's qualification follow:

Women's indoor volleyball qualification

Details of the women's qualification follow:

Men's beach volleyball qualification

Women's beach volleyball qualification

Medal summary

Medal table

Medalists

References

External links

 
 
 
 
 
 
 Federation Internationale de Volleyball (FIVB.org)

 
2012 Summer Olympics events
2012
O
O
International volleyball competitions hosted by the United Kingdom